The 2021 LTP Women's Open was a professional tennis tournament  played on outdoor green clay courts. It was the 1st edition of the tournament and part of the 2021 WTA 125K series, offering a total of $115,000 in prize money. It took place in Charleston, South Carolina, United States from 26 July to 1 August 2021.

Singles main-draw entrants

Seeds 

 1 Rankings as of 19 July 2021.

Other entrants 
The following players received a wildcard into the singles main draw:
  Louisa Chirico
  Fiona Crawley
  Ellie Douglas
  Katarina Jokić

The following players received entry using protected rankings:
  Rebecca Marino
  Peangtarn Plipuech
  Carol Zhao

Withdrawals
Before the tournament
  Hailey Baptiste → replaced by  Emma Navarro
  Mona Barthel → replaced by  Robin Anderson
  Aliona Bolsova → replaced by  Maria Mateas
  Clara Burel → replaced by  Kateryna Bondarenko
  Lizette Cabrera → replaced by  Hanna Chang
  Harriet Dart → replaced by  Peangtarn Plipuech
  Francesca Di Lorenzo → replaced by  Han Na-lae
  Caroline Dolehide → replaced by  Usue Maitane Arconada
  Magdalena Fręch → replaced by  Catherine Harrison
  Anastasia Gasanova → replaced by  Sachia Vickery
  Giulia Gatto-Monticone → replaced by  Beatriz Haddad Maia
  Leonie Küng → replaced by  Liang En-shuo
  Christina McHale → replaced by  Allie Kiick
  Nuria Párrizas Díaz → replaced by  Whitney Osuigwe
  Natalia Vikhlyantseva → replaced by  Aldila Sutjiadi
  Renata Zarazúa → replaced by  Alexa Glatch

Doubles entrants

Seeds 

 1 Rankings as of 19 July 2021.

Other entrants 
The following pair received a wildcard into the doubles main draw:
  Sophie Chang /  Emma Navarro

Champions

Singles

  Varvara Lepchenko  def.  Jamie Loeb 7–6(7–4), 4–6, 6–4

Doubles

  Liang En-shuo /  Rebecca Marino def.  Erin Routliffe /  Aldila Sutjiadi, 5–7, 7–5, [10–7]

References

External links 
 Official website

2021 LTP Women's Open
2021 WTA 125 tournaments
2021 in American tennis
July 2021 sports events in the United States
August 2021 sports events in the United States
2021 in sports in South Carolina